In Irish mythology, the fear gorta (Irish: Man of hunger / Man of famine; also known as the fear gortach) is a phantom of hunger resembling an emaciated human.

According to Yeats' Fairy and Folk Tales of the Irish Peasantry the fear gorta walks the earth during times of famine, seeking alms from passers-by. In this version, the fear gorta can be a potential source of good luck for generous individuals. Harvey relates a myth that the fear gorta was a harbinger of famine during the Great Irish Famine of the 1840s, and that the spirit originally arises from a patch of hungry grass (féar gortach).  In the region of Kiltubbrid, the term is also used to refer to a sudden hunger that can seize people traveling in the mountains, that will become fatal if not quickly satiated.

See also

 Wendigo

References

Aos Sí
Fairies
Fantasy creatures
Irish folklore
Irish legendary creatures
Irish words and phrases
Famines in Ireland
Tuatha Dé Danann